SLSC may refer to:

 Surf Life Saving Club, volunteer institutions in Australia and New Zealand
 Saint Louis Science Center, science museum in St. Louis, Missouri
 South London Swimming Club, club in London, England
 Sri Lanka Signals Corps, combat support corps of the Sri Lanka army
 Saratoga Lake Sailing Club, located on Saratoga Lake in Ballston Spa, New York